Raul Guilherme Martins, better known as Raul (born 13 March 1990 in Curitiba), is a Brazilian footballer who plays as a right back.

Career
He played in the base of the rival, Coritiba in 2005, the same year he arrived in Fin.

Had the first chance in professional Altet in 2009, playing Brazilian, almost all of that holder. In 2010 was not explained away by problems, returned to base. In 2010 it overcame the problems and returned to the club's professional team.

Career statistics
(Correct )

Contract
 Atlético Paranaense.

Honours

Club
Atlético Paranaense
Campeonato Paranaense: 2009

International
Brasil U-17
Campeonato Sul Americano (U-17): 2005, 2007

References

External links
 ogol.com
 soccerway
 sambafoot

1990 births
Footballers from Curitiba
Living people
Brazilian footballers
Club Athletico Paranaense players
Joinville Esporte Clube players
Botafogo Futebol Clube (SP) players
Fortaleza Esporte Clube players
Boa Esporte Clube players
Londrina Esporte Clube players
Campeonato Brasileiro Série A players
Campeonato Brasileiro Série B players
Association football defenders